Karel Klečka (born 1 August 1936) is a Czech gymnast. He competed in eight events at the 1964 Summer Olympics.

References

1936 births
Living people
Czech male artistic gymnasts
Olympic gymnasts of Czechoslovakia
Gymnasts at the 1964 Summer Olympics
Sportspeople from Ostrava